D. J. Johnson (born October 21, 1998) is an American college football outside linebacker for the Oregon Ducks.

Early life and high school career
Johnson grew up in Sacramento, California and attended Luther Burbank High School. He had 85 tackles, 14.5 sacks, and 31 tackles for loss as a senior. Johnson was rated a four-star recruit and committed to play college football at Miami over offers from Washington, Alabama, USC, Florida, Georgia, Oregon, Ole Miss, Tennessee, and Oklahoma.

College career
Johnson began his college career at Miami. He played in eight games and made three tackles as a freshman. After the season, Johnson left the program with the intent to transfer.

Johnson ultimately transferred to Oregon. He sat out for the regular season of his first year with the Ducks per NCAA transfer rules. As a redshirt sophomore, Johnson played in 13 games and finished the season with 14 tackles, five tackles for loss, and two sacks. He was moved to tight end for the 2020. Johnson finished the season with 10 receptions for 113 yards and three touchdowns. He played both defensive end and tight end as a redshirt senior and had 11 tackles with two tackles for loss and a sack on defense and caught one pass for 11 yards on offense. Johnson used the extra year of eligibility granted to college athletes in 2020 due to the COVID-19 pandemic and returned to Oregon for a fifth year.

References

External links
Miami Hurricanes bio
Oregon Ducks bio

Living people
Players of American football from California
American football linebackers
Oregon Ducks football players
Miami Hurricanes football players
American football tight ends
Year of birth missing (living people)